Natrona Heights is an unincorporated community in Harrison Township, Allegheny County in the U.S. state of Pennsylvania. Natrona Heights is situated near the Allegheny River, Natrona, Brackenridge, and Tarentum.

Museums and other points of interest

Natrona Heights is home to both the Pittsburgh-Tarentum Campmeeting Association, a Methodist-based camp over 160 years old, and to the Pittsburgh Buddhist Center.  The town's first structure, the Burtner House, still stands and is open for festivals several times a year.   The Community Library of Allegheny Valley, Harrison Branch also serves Natrona Heights.

Education

The community is within the Highlands School District. Highlands High School and Highlands Middle School are in Natrona Heights. Private schools include Our Lady of the Most Blessed Sacrament Elementary School and Saint Joseph High School.

Usage in popular culture

Knightriders
The film Knightriders (1981) by George A. Romero starring Ed Harris used scenes shot on Pennsylvania Avenue and in a restaurant on Freeport Road in Natrona Heights, as well as several scenes in neighboring Natrona for the movie. Most of the film was shot in nearby Fawn Township.

Promised Land
During interviews for the film Promised Land (2012) which was shot in Western Pennsylvania, star John Krasinski revealed that his father Ronald had grown up in the Natrona Heights area.

Notable people

 Greg Christy, former NFL offensive lineman  
 Jeff Christy, former NFL offensive lineman 
 John Filo, Pulitzer Prize winning photojournalist 
 Cookie Gilchrist, former AFL and NFL running back 
 Larry J. Kulick, bishop of the Diocese of Greensburg 
 Robert W. Olszewski, painter and miniatures artist
 Ed Sikov, American film scholar and author
 Tom Young, basketball coach

See also
 Environmentalism – Natrona Heights has a United States Environmental Protection Agency Superfund site
 National Register of Historic Places listings in Allegheny County, Pennsylvania

References

External links
Harrison Township

Pittsburgh metropolitan area
Unincorporated communities in Allegheny County, Pennsylvania
Unincorporated communities in Pennsylvania